Schalk Willem 'Hond' van der Merwe is a former South African rugby union player who last played for the  in the Currie Cup. His usual position is prop.

He joined the  prior to the 2014 season.

He joined Irish Pro14 side Ulster prior to the 2017–18 season. He was released on 4 December 2018 after making just three Pro14 appearances.

References

External links
Schalk Van der Merwe on espnscrum.com.
Schalk Van der Merwe on itsrugby.co.uk.

Living people
1990 births
Afrikaner people
South African people of Dutch descent
South African rugby union players
Rugby union props
Alumni of Grey College, Bloemfontein
Free State Cheetahs players
Griffons (rugby union) players
Lions (United Rugby Championship) players
Montpellier Hérault Rugby players
Southern Kings players
Rugby union players from Limpopo
Ulster Rugby players
Expatriate rugby union players in France
Expatriate rugby union players in Northern Ireland
South African expatriate sportspeople in Northern Ireland
South African expatriate sportspeople in France
South African expatriate rugby union players